The Shrine of Christ the King, formerly known as St. Clara and St. Gelasius, is a historic Catholic church of the Archdiocese of Chicago in the Woodlawn neighborhood. It is now the National Headquarters of the American Province of the Institute of Christ the King Sovereign Priest, who are restoring the church after a 2015 fire.

History

Founding 
The original church was built to serve the Carmelites and their growing parish of St. Clara, which had been founded in 1894, to serve the majority-German community in Woodlawn following the population boom of the World's Columbian Exposition. Notable architect Henry Schlacks was contracted to design a new church, which is distinctively Renaissance Revival, and cost the equivalent of $7 million dollars when it was finished in 1928. With the canonization of Thérèse of Lisieux in 1925, the church also became the site of the National Shrine to Therese of Lisieux.

Decline 
Major demographic change in the Woodlawn neighborhood began with Hansberry v. Lee, which prohibited racially-restrictive clauses in real estate contracts. By 1960, Woodlawn was majority African American. Fr. Tracy O'Sullivan, O.Carm., the pastor of the parish during this time, was involved in gang outreach and worked for nondiscriminatory affordable housing. The church was renamed St. Clara-St. Cyril in 1969, to reflect the consolidation of 2 parishes. 

An April of 1976 fire destroyed most of the original interior of the church, and parish membership struggled for the following decades. in 1990, a third parish, Holy Cross, was closed and merged into St. Clara, and the parish was renamed St. Gelasius, for the pope of African heritage, in a nod to the membership of the parish.

By June of 2002, the number of regular worshippers had fallen below 100 per week, and the church was closed and slated for demolition. However, the greater Woodlawn community protested and petitioned for the building to be protected under the Chicago Landmarks Ordinance, and it was designated as such in 2004.

Institute of Christ the King 
In 2004, then-Archbishop of Chicago Francis George invited the canons of the Institute of Christ the King Sovereign Priest to take over St. Clara, who established the Shrine of Christ the King in the church and situated the headquarters of the Institute's American Province there. The Institute began working on the interior of the church, and hosted community and cultural events which began to bring the church building back into the Woodlawn community.

On October 7, 2015, the building was struck by another fire, eliminating most of the work that had been done on the church since its 2004 take-over. The shrine was nearly demolished yet again after being declared to be in 'hazardous condition', but was formally given to the Institute by the Archdiocese for work to continue on February 28, 2016. By 2020, $4 million dollars had been invested into repairing the church, installing a new roofing system, new drainage, and reinforcement of the existing walls. 

Notable architect William Heyer has been contracted for the restoration of the building, part of which will include placing a greater focus on the high altar, where an image of the Infant Christ the King will be enthroned against a sunburst background. Other side shrines will be dedicated to the Annunciation, the Nativity, the Epiphany, the Virgin Mary, Saint Joseph, Francis de Sales, Thomas Aquinas, Benedict of Nursia, Therese of the Child Jesus, and the Crucifixion.

In February of 2021, the Institute announced the acquisition of what was formerly the school building of St. Clara to serve as a center of parish life for the shrine, calling it the Holy Family House. The building will specifically serve the needs of the faithful of the shrine, as opposed to the administrative needs of the Province.

The shrine has been the site of protests against Cardinal Blase Cupich's implementation of the 2021 motu proprio Traditionis Custodes. Since August 1, 2022 the celebration of public Masses and Sacraments is suspended.

References

External Links 
The Shrine Landmark's Instagram Page

Shrine Landmark's Website

Architectural Renderings of the Restored Shrine

Roman Catholic churches in Chicago
Roman Catholic churches completed in 1927
20th-century Roman Catholic church buildings in the United States
Church fires in the United States
Churches used by the Institute of Christ the King Sovereign Priest